This is a list of Muggins Mountain Wilderness flora. The Muggins Wilderness covers about 15-20 percent of the Muggins Mountains, (of southwest Arizona's, northwest Sonoran Desert), and is on the southwest of the triangular mountain region; the southwest mountain flank is block faulted and parallels the northwest-southeast Dome Valley and the northeast flank of the northeast end of the Gila Mountains, also northwest-southeast aligned.

The Muggins Mountain Wilderness is excessively arid, especially as summer progresses, and the wilderness is also a sun-drenched southwesterly facing region.

Perennials

Perennials: Common name

Anderson thornbush
Bebbia chuckwalla's delight
Brittlebush
Catclaw acacia
Creosote bush
Desert fir, (named Peucephyllum, a monotypic genus of the Asteraceae, (daisy, aster, sunflower family))—(a tree form resembling the creosote bush, in color, form, and height)
Desert globemallow
Desert hollyalso called saltbush-(found with some mesquite ssp-Muggins Wash)

Desert ironwood
Desert lavender
Hairy milkweed
Rush milkweed
Desert milkweed, leafless milkweed
Ocotillo
Blue palo verde
Saguaro
Scruffy prairie clover
Smoketree (Psorothamnus)
Smokethorn
White ratany

Perennials: Genus-species-(binomials)

Acacia greggii
Asclepias subulata
Atriplex hymenelytra–Saltbush
Bebbia juncea
Carnegiea gigantea
Cercidium floridum
Dalea albiflora
Encelia farinosa
Fouquieria splendens

Funastrum hirtellum
Hyptis emoryi
Krameria grayi
Larrea tridentata
Lycium andersonii
Olneya tesota
Peucephyllum schottii
Psorothamnus spinosus
Sphaeralcea ambigua

Annuals

Common name

Arizona lupine
California fagonbush
Canyon ragweed
Chicura
Desert sunflower
Desert tobacco
Desert trumpet
Fremont's pincushion

Mojave desert star
Narrow-leaved popcorn flower
Rattlesnake weed
Rigid spiny herb
Scorpionweed
Notch-leaved phacelia
White-bract stick leaf
White-bract blazing star
White tackstem

Genus-species

Ambrosia ambrosioides
Calycoseris wrightii
Chaenactis fremontii
Chorizanthe rigida
Cryptantha angustifolia
Eriogonum spp
Desert trumpet
Euphorbia albomarginata

Fagonia laevis
Geraea canescens
Lupinus arizonicus
Mentzelia involucrata
Monoptilon bellioides
Nicotiana obtusifolia
(Phacelia crenulata spp)
Scorpionweed

The three washes

Wash 1: Twin Tanks Wash

Wash 2: Muggins Wash

The "saltbush", Atriplex hymenelytra, the desert holly is found from the 1/2 to 7/8 point up Muggins Wash and side washes to the northeast-(because of the geology-). Mesquite is in the vicinity, but very less common. The main drainage of Muggins Wash which drains from the north-northwest contains areas of the Peucephyllum, the desert fir. This occurs just north of the split to the major northeast drainage of Muggins Wash, which is to the east of Muggins Peak.

Wash 3: Morgan Wash

On ridges, the headwater sub, sub-washes between Muggins Wash to northwest, some special plants are known:
Hairy milkweed, Funastrum hirtellum

See also
Muggins Mountains
Muggins Mountain Wilderness

References

Turner, Bowers, & Burgess. Sonoran Desert Plants; an Ecological Atlas, Raymond M. Turner, Janice E. Bowers, Tony L. Burgess, c 1995, Univ. of Arizona Press, Tucson. 504 pages.
Warren, Scott S.  Exploring Arizona's Wild Areas. Mountaineers Books, 1996, 2nd Ed 2002. (softcover).
Reference to the common plants — (a short list-(perennials)-(p 265): Muggins Mountains Wilderness: Seasons, Plants and Wildlife: "ocotillo, creosote bush, brittlebush, blue paloverde, Desert Ironwood, and Smoketree (Psorothamnus);" p. 265.

.M
Muggins Mountain
Protected areas of Yuma County, Arizona